Lasianthus rhinophyllus is a species of plant in the family Rubiaceae. It is endemic to Sri Lanka. The name may also be spelt Lasianthus rhizophyllus.

Taxonomy
There is some confusion over the spelling of the epithet. , the International Plant Names Index has the spelling rhinophyllus, whereas Plants of the World Online has rhizophyllus.

References

Flora of Sri Lanka
rhinophyllus
Critically endangered plants
Taxonomy articles created by Polbot